June uprising might refer to:

 June Rebellion, anti-monarchist  uprising  of Parisian workers and students from June 5 to June 6, 1832 which is the basis for Les Misérables
 June Days uprising, French workers' revolt from June 23 to June 25, 1848
 Łódź insurrection, uprising in 1905 by Polish workers in Łódź against the Russian Empire
 June Struggle, the 1987 protests that forced the Republic of Korea to hold free, democratic elections.
 Uprising in June 1923, Bulgaria by the Bulgarian Agrarian People's Union after the Stambolisky's government was overthrown in a coup d'état.
 June 1941 uprising in eastern Herzegovina in the Independent State of Croatia, which was established on the territory of the defeated Kingdom of Yugoslavia.
 June Uprising in Lithuania, uprising by Lithuanians against the retreating Red Army in 1941
 East German uprising of 1953 against the Stalinist German Democratic Republic